In mathematics, the Eckmann–Hilton argument (or Eckmann–Hilton principle or Eckmann–Hilton theorem) is an argument about two unital magma structures on a set where one is a homomorphism for the other. Given this, the structures are the same, and the resulting magma is a commutative monoid. This can then be used to prove the commutativity of the higher homotopy groups. The principle is named after Beno Eckmann and Peter Hilton, who used it in a 1962 paper.

The Eckmann–Hilton result

  for all  .

Remarks
In fact, associativity follows. Likewise, we do not have to require that the two operations have the same neutral element; this is a consequence.

Proof
First, observe that the units of the two operations coincide:
.
 
Now, let .
Then . This establishes that the two operations coincide and are commutative.

For associativity, .

Two-dimensional proof
The above proof also has a "two-dimensional" presentation that better illustrates the application to higher homotopy groups.
The interchange property can then be expressed as follows:

 without ambiguity.

Let  and  be the units for vertical and horizontal composition respectively. Then , so both units are equal.

Finally, for all ,
, so composition is associative.

Remarks 
An even more abstract way of stating the theorem is: If  is a monoid object in the category of monoids, then  is in fact a commutative monoid.

It is important that a similar argument does NOT give such a triviality result in the case of monoid objects in the categories of small categories or of groupoids. Instead the notion of group object in the category of groupoids turns out to be equivalent to the notion of crossed module. This leads to the idea of using multiple groupoid objects in homotopy theory. 

More generally, the Eckmann–Hilton argument is a special case of the use of the interchange law in the theory of (strict) double and multiple categories. A (strict) double category is a set, or class, equipped with two category structures, each of which is a morphism for the other structure. If the compositions in the two category structures are written  then the interchange law reads 

whenever both sides are defined. For an example of its use, and some discussion, see the paper of Higgins referenced below. The interchange law implies that a double category contains a family of abelian monoids. 

The history in relation to homotopy groups is interesting. The workers in topology of the early 20th century were aware that the nonabelian fundamental group was of use in geometry and analysis; that abelian homology groups could be defined in all dimensions; and that for a connected space, the first homology group was the fundamental group made abelian. So there was a desire to generalise the nonabelian fundamental group to all dimensions. 

In 1932, Eduard Čech submitted a paper on higher homotopy groups to the International Congress of Mathematics at Zürich. It is said that Witold Hurewicz attended this conference, and his first work on higher homotopy groups appeared in 1935. Thus the dreams of the early topologists have long been regarded as a mirage. 

Cubical higher homotopy groupoids are constructed  for filtered spaces in the book Nonabelian algebraic topology cited below, which develops basic algebraic topology, including higher analogues to the Seifert–Van Kampen theorem, without using singular homology or simplicial approximation.

References
John Baez: Eckmann–Hilton principle (week 89)
John Baez: Eckmann–Hilton principle (week 100)
.
 .
.
.

 Murray Bremner and  Sara Madariaga. (2014) Permutation of elements in double semigroups

External links
Eugenia Cheng of 'the Catsters' video team explains the Eckmann–Hilton argument.
 Higher dimensional group theory

Category theory
Theorems in abstract algebra